The Hubert de Blanck Theater is a small theatre situated on  Calle Calzada in the Vedado district of Havana, Cuba, named after Hubert de Blanck. It has a seating capacity for 267 people, and offers regular performances of contemporary and classical plays. There are also occasional presentations of well-known foreign productions that have toured to Cuba.

Address
Calle Calzada, No. 654 entre A y B, 
Vedado, Havana, 10400

Theatres in Havana